Semyon Yurevich Koshelev (born January 11, 1996) is a Kazakhstani professional ice hockey player currently playing for the Krasnaya Armiya in the Junior Hockey League (MHL). Koshelev selected 4th overall in the first round of 2013 KHL Junior Draft by Neftekhimik Nizhnekamsk. On November 6, 2013, CSKA Moscow acquired the rights to Semyon Koshelev.

Playing career

International play
He was a best top scorer with 13 points at the 2013 IIHF World U18 Division B Championship with Team Kazakhstan and helped to promote the team to Division IA.

Career statistics

Regular season

International

References

External links

1996 births
Kazakhstani ice hockey left wingers
Kazzinc-Torpedo players
Living people
Sportspeople from Oskemen